Cape Wheeler is an abrupt rock scarp rising to 460 metres, an Antarctic headland which forms the north side of the entrance to Wright Inlet on the east coast of Palmer Land. The cape was photographed from the air in 1940 by the United States Antarctic Service (USAS) and in 1947 by the Ronne Antarctic Research Expedition (RARE). It was named by Jackie Ronne, expedition member  and newspaper correspondent, for John N. Wheeler, president of the North American Newspaper Alliance and a contributor to the expedition.

Headlands of Palmer Land